Volodymyr Nalkovych Bondar (born 16 October 1968, Lutsk, Ukraine) is a Ukrainian political activist and later politician, member of the Verkhovna Rada.

In 1995-2001 he worked at the Volyn Oblast State Administration.

In 2002-2005 with breaks Bondar was a member of the Verkhovna Rada representing Reforms and Order Party within the Our Ukraine Bloc of Viktor Yushchenko.

In 2005-2007 he served as a Governor of Volyn Oblast.

References

External links
 Profile at the Official Ukraine Today portal

1968 births
Living people
People from Lutsk
Lesya Ukrainka East European National University alumni
Governors of Volyn Oblast
Fourth convocation members of the Verkhovna Rada
Reforms and Order Party politicians
Our Ukraine (political party) politicians
United Centre politicians
Recipients of the Order of Danylo Halytsky